Halldor Østervold Stenevik (born 2 February 2000) is a Norwegian footballer who plays for Strømsgodset. He formerly played for Fyllingsdalen, Brann and Nest-Sotra.

References

2000 births
Living people
People from Hordaland
People from Austevoll
Norwegian footballers
Norway youth international footballers
Eliteserien players
Norwegian First Division players
SK Brann players
Nest-Sotra Fotball players
Strømsgodset Toppfotball players
Sogndal Fotball players
Association football midfielders
Sportspeople from Vestland